Macclesfield Town Council is the town council for Macclesfield which was established in 2015. Created following a Local Governance Review carried out by Cheshire East Council, the new council adopted town council status on 5 May 2015, allowing it to appoint its chairman as Mayor of Macclesfield.

Town Mayor
Macclesfield Town council has a Town Mayor and Deputy Mayor. A councillor can only hold the position of mayor for one year.

Councillors

The current list of councillors in Macclesfield Town Council, following the Local Elections on 2 May 2019.

The table below shows current and former compositions of the council.

Elections

2 May 2019 
The council had its second election on 2 May 2019, the same day as the 2019 United Kingdom local elections in England and Northern Ireland, which included elections to Cheshire East Council. The Conservatives lost control of Cheshire East Council for the first time, including losing all their Macclesfield councillors. These results were reflected in the Town Council too, where the Tories lost all eight of their seats. Labour fared better, gaining five seats to a total of nine, while Independents won the remaining three.

Broken Cross and Upton Ward
Fin Shenton and Chris Wilcock were elected. The turnout was 66.1%.

7 May 2015 
The first election of Macclesfield Town Council was held on 7 May 2015. Broken Cross, Central, Tytherington, South and West & Ivy Wards elect two councillors. East and Hurdsfield Wards elect one.

Broken Cross and Upton Ward
Liz Durham and Martin Hardy were elected. The turnout was 66.1%.

Central Ward
Bev Dooley and Janet Jackson were elected. The turnout was 59.3%.

East Ward
Philip Bolton was elected. The turnout was 68.6%.

Hurdsfield Ward 
Matthew Sharrocks was elected. The turnout was 57.15%.

South Ward
Neil Puttick and Chris Andrew were elected. The turnout was 63.1%.

Tytherington Ward
Arnold Ainsley and Gareth Jones were elected. The turnout was 70.0%.

West and Ivy Ward
Alift Harewood-Jones MBE and Adam Schofield were elected. The turnout was 62.1%.

Cadet to the Mayor of Macclesfield
In 2016 the incoming Mayor, Cllr Alift Harewood-Jones, established the position of Mayor's cadet, to have a young person from a local cadet organisation to assist in civic duties.

References

Town Councils in Cheshire
Local precepting authorities in England
Town Council